The 1978 West Texas State Buffaloes football team was an American football team that represented West Texas State University (now known as West Texas A&M University) as a member of the Missouri Valley Conference during the 1978 NCAA Division I-A football season. In their second year under head coach Bill Yung, the team compiled a 3–8 record (1–5 in the MVC).

Schedule

References

West Texas State
West Texas A&M Buffaloes football seasons
West Texas State Buffaloes football